Tingena xanthomicta is a species of moth in the family Oecophoridae. It is endemic to New Zealand and has been found in both the North and South Islands. This species inhabits native scrub on hillsides and appears to be attracted to Coprosma areolata. Adults are on the wing from November until February.

Taxonomy
This species was first described by Edward Meyrick in 1916 using a specimen collected in Wellington in November by George Hudson and named Borkhausenia xanthomicta. George Hudson discussed and illustrated this species under the name B. xanthomicta in his 1928 publication The butterflies and moths of New Zealand. Philpott discussed this species under the name B. xanthomicta  and studied the male genitalia of this species. In 1988 J. S. Dugdale placed this species within the genus Tingena. Dugdale noted that the male paralectotype from Wellington has genitalia very similar to that of the male T. affinis as illustrated by Philpott in 1926. Dugdale goes on to state that the male paralectotype genitalia agrees with the illustrations of that species figured by Philpott in 1926. The female lectotype, collected in Wellington, is held in at the Natural History Museum, London.

Description

Meyrick described this species as follows:

Distribution
This species is endemic to New Zealand. It has been observed in the Wellington region, at Queenstown, at Lake Wakatipu and in Invercargill.

Behaviour 
Adults of this species are on the wing in November to February.

Habitat 
This species inhabits native scrub on hillsides and appears to be attracted to Coprosma areolata.

References

Oecophoridae
Moths of New Zealand
Moths described in 1916
Endemic fauna of New Zealand
Taxa named by Edward Meyrick
Endemic moths of New Zealand